Wawonii (formerly called Wowoni) is an island in the Banda Sea, Indonesia, off the south east coast of Sulawesi. Its area is 705.71 km2 and at the 2020 Census it had a population of 37,050; the official estimate as at mid 2022 was 38,383. From 2013, it forms a regency of its own within Southeast Sulawesi Province, having previously been a part of Konawe Regency; the new Regency, which comprises the seven districts on Wawonii Island, is named Konawe Islands Regency (Kabupaten Konawe Kepulauan). The administrative capital of the new Regency is Langara (in West Wawonii District).

References

Islands of Sulawesi
Landforms of Southeast Sulawesi
Populated places in Indonesia